,
There have been 23 coaches of the Manly Warringah Sea Eagles since their first season in 1947.

List of Coaches
As of the end of the 2022 NRL season

* as captain-coach

See also

List of current NRL coaches
List of current NRL Women's coaches

References

External links

Coaches
 
Sydney-sport-related lists
National Rugby League lists
Lists of rugby league coaches